Admiral of the Fleet Sir Michael Le Fanu  (2 August 1913 – 28 November 1970) was a Royal Navy officer. He fought in the Second World War as gunnery officer in a cruiser operating in the Home Fleet during the Norwegian campaign and the Battle of the Mediterranean and then as gunnery officer in a battleship operating in the Eastern Fleet before becoming liaison officer between the British Pacific Fleet and the United States Third Fleet. After the War he commanded a frigate, a training establishment and an aircraft carrier. He served as First Sea Lord and Chief of the Naval Staff in the late 1960s. In that role, in the face of economic difficulties, he worked hard to reshape the Navy as an anti-submarine force operating primarily in the Atlantic Ocean.

Early life
Born the son of Captain Hugh Barrington Le Fanu RN (of Huguenot descent) and Georgiana Harriott Le Fanu (née Kingscote), Le Fanu was educated at Bedford School and the Royal Naval College, Dartmouth.

Naval career
Le Fanu joined the Royal Navy as a cadet in 1926 and was posted to the cruiser  in the Atlantic Fleet before being promoted to midshipman on 1 September 1931 and being posted to the cruiser HMS York. Promoted to sub-lieutenant on 1 May 1934, he joined the destroyer HMS Whitshed in the Mediterranean Fleet in March 1935 and was promoted to lieutenant on 1 June 1935. He was posted to the destroyer HMS Bulldog in the Home Fleet in September 1936 before training as a gunnery specialist during 1938 and then being posted to the staff of the Commander-in-Chief, Mediterranean Fleet.

Le Fanu served in the Second World War being posted to the cruiser  operating in the Home Fleet as gunnery officer in December 1939. While aboard Aurora, he was mentioned in despatches for his services during the Norwegian campaign in Spring 1940 and awarded the Distinguished Service Cross for his actions in November 1941 when an Italian convoy was destroyed during the Battle of the Mediterranean.

Promoted to lieutenant commander on 1 June 1942, Le Fanu joined the gunnery staff of the Commander-in-Chief Home Fleet that month and then transferred to the battleship  operating as part of the Eastern Fleet as gunnery officer in March 1944. Promoted to commander on 31 December 1944, he was posted as liaison officer between the British Pacific Fleet and the United States Third Fleet in January 1945 and was awarded the United States Legion of Merit for his actions. He was also invited to attend the signing of the Japanese Instrument of Surrender in the USS Missouri on 2 September 1945.

After the War Le Fanu served on the experimental staff at the shore establishment HMS Excellent and in 1948 he became executive officer in the cruiser HMS Superb. He was promoted to captain on 30 June 1949 and became Naval Assistant to the First Sea Lord at the Admiralty. He was given command of the frigate  as Captain (F) of the Third Training Squadron in October 1951, and returned to the Admiralty to join the staff of the Chief Scientist in 1952. He attended the Imperial Defence College in 1953 and became commanding officer of the training establishment HMS Ganges at Harwich in December 1954. He was given command of the aircraft carrier  in February 1957 and was promoted to rear admiral on 7 July 1958 on appointment as Director-General, Weapons at the Admiralty. He was appointed a Companion of the Order of the Bath in the 1960 Birthday Honours. He became Flag Officer Second in Command Far East Fleet in July 1960 and was promoted to vice admiral on 25 October 1961 on appointment as Controller of the Navy. Advanced to Knight Commander of the Order of the Bath in the 1963 Birthday Honours and promoted to full admiral on 29 September 1965, he became Commander-in-Chief, Middle East in December 1965. In that role he served as Joint Commander of the three services in the Middle East during the evacuation of British Nationals during the Aden Emergency.

Advanced to Knight Grand Cross of the Order of the Bath in the 1968 New Year Honours, Le Fanu became First Sea Lord and Chief of the Naval Staff in August 1968. In the face of economic difficulties he worked hard to reshape the Navy as an anti-submarine force operating primarily in the Atlantic Ocean. He was nominated for the post of Chief of the Defence Staff but never held the office because he was suddenly discovered to be terminally ill with Chronic Lymphocytic Leukaemia (CLL). He was promoted to Admiral of the Fleet on 3 July 1970, on his retirement, and died in London on 28 November 1970.

Family
In 1943 Le Fanu married Prudence Grace Morgan, daughter of Admiral Sir Llewellyn Vaughan Morgan; they had two sons and a daughter.

Notes

Sources

Further reading
 

1913 births
1970 deaths
Graduates of Britannia Royal Naval College
First Sea Lords and Chiefs of the Naval Staff
Knights Grand Cross of the Order of the Bath
Lords of the Admiralty
People educated at Bedford School
Recipients of the Distinguished Service Cross (United Kingdom)
Knights Commander of the Order of the Bath
Officers of the Legion of Merit
Royal Navy admirals of the fleet
People from Lindfield, West Sussex
Royal Navy officers of World War II
British military personnel of the Aden Emergency
Military personnel from Sussex